Martin Luther King Jr. Parkway may be:

Martin Luther King Jr. Parkway (Jacksonville)
Martin Luther King Jr. Parkway (Des Moines)

See also
List of streets named after Martin Luther King Jr.
Martin Luther King Jr. Drive (disambiguation)
Martin Luther King Jr. Expressway (disambiguation)
Martin Luther King Jr. Boulevard (disambiguation)
Martin Luther King Jr. Parkway (disambiguation)
Martin Luther King Jr. Way (disambiguation)